David Creasser (born 18 June 1965) is an English former professional rugby league footballer who played in the 1980s and 1990s. He played at representative level for British Amateur Rugby League Association (BARLA) Young Lions (alongside Garry Schofield), and Great Britain, and at club level for Hunslet Parkside ARLFC, Leeds (Heritage No. 1124), Keighley Cougars and Bramlsy, as a goal-kicking , i.e. number 3 or 4.

Playing career

Club career
Creasser made his début for Leeds in the 30–14 victory over Batley in the 1983–84 Yorkshire Cup first-round match during the 1983–84 season at Mount Pleasant, Batley on 4 September 1983.

Creasser played , and scored five goals in Leeds' 18–10 victory over Widnes in the 1983–84 John Player Special Trophy Final during the 1983–84 season at Central Park, Wigan on 14 January 1984, and played , and scored a try, and three goals in the 14–15 defeat by St. Helens in the 1987–88 John Player Special Trophy Final during the 1987–88 season at Central Park, Wigan on 9 January 1988.

Creasser was forced to retire after the 1991–92 season at the age of 27 due to persistent shoulder injuries. His Testimonial match took place in October 1993 when Leeds played New Zealand in the 1993 Kiwis tour.

International honours
David Creasser won caps for Great Britain while at Leeds in 1985 against France (2 matches), in 1987 against France, and in 1988 against France.

References

1965 births
Living people
English rugby league players
Rugby league centres
Rugby league players from Leeds
Leeds Rhinos players
Great Britain national rugby league team players